Man of the Year (also known as Husband, Italian Style) is a 1971 Italian commedia sexy all'italiana directed by Marco Vicario. The film was a blockbuster at the Italian box office.

Plot  
Michele Cannaritta (Lando Buzzanca) is a Sicilian who moved to Bergamo apparently in search of work. He was actually kicked off the island for his insatiable sexual libido. Hired as a butler and driver by the Lampugnani family, his employer takes him to a doctor (Bernard Blier), who discovers Michele's physical peculiarity: triorchidism.

The news spreads like wildfire in the city among the friends and acquaintances of the Lampugnani couple. Michele can thus satisfy his sexual appetite with a series of ladies from the good Bergamo society, not without several problems and to the embarrassment of many.

Tired of the constant gossip and insinuations of her friends, Mrs. Lampugnani fires Michele. The man moves to the home of Carla, one of her friends, but it won't be his last move.

Cast 
 Lando Buzzanca: Michele Cannaritta 
 Rossana Podestà: Cocò Lampugnani
 Luciano Salce: Achille Lampugnani
 Adriana Asti:  Agnese Trescori
 Princess Ira von Fürstenberg: Moglie di Mezzini
 Bernard Blier: Doctor Mezzini
 Sylva Koscina: Carla
 Evi Marandi: Giusy
 Brigitte Skay: Cameriera
 Angela Luce: Cameriera
 Femi Benussi: Ersilia
 Sandro Dori: Ambrogio 
 Michele Cimarosa: Tano Fichera
 Simonetta Stefanelli: daughter of Tano 
 Paola Tedesco: friend of Cocò  
 Greta Vajant:  friend of Cocò
 Pia Giancaro: friend of Cocò 
 Jacques Herlin: Professor Godè 
 Piero Chiara:  magistrate

References

External links

1971 films
Commedia sexy all'italiana
1970s sex comedy films
Films directed by Marco Vicario
Films scored by Armando Trovajoli
Adultery in films
Films set in Milan
Films about immigration
1971 comedy films
1970s Italian films